Charles Gray Compton Cavendish, 7th Baron Chesham (born 11 November 1974 in Sydney, Australia), is the present Baron Chesham having succeeded to the title on 27 August 2009 on the death of his father, Nicholas Cavendish, 6th Baron Chesham.

A member of the Cavendish family headed by the Duke of Devonshire, he was the first son of Nicholas Charles Cavendish and Suzanne Adrienne Byrne, his second wife whom he married in 1973. Lord Chesham is in remainder to the dukedom of Devonshire.

The Gray connection in Charles' and his younger brother William's names comes from his mother's ancestor John Gray (15 April 1821 – 6 September 1892). John emigrated to Australia from Lowtherstown, Northern Ireland, on board the Wilson in 1842 with his parents William and Margaret Gray.

Lord Chesham attended The King's School, Parramatta, followed by Durham University and City University, London.

Marriage
He married Sarah Elizabeth Dawson, daughter of Bruce Dawson, on 15 Jun 2002.

Lord and Lady Chesham have three children:
Hon. Isabella Alannah Suzanne Cavendish (b. 12 April 2004)
Hon. Oliver Nicholas Bruce Cavendish (b. 15 February 2007) 
Hon. Ophelia Elizabeth Nicola Cavendish (b. 30 September 2010)

See also
 Duke of Devonshire
 Baron Chesham

References

External links 
 www.burkespeerage.com

1974 births
Living people
Charles Cavendish, 7th Baron Chesham
7
Eldest sons of British hereditary barons
Australian peers
Chesham
Place of birth missing (living people)
People from Sydney
People educated at The King's School, Parramatta
Alumni of Durham University
Alumni of City, University of London